Tang Shiu Kin Hospital is a community hospital on Morrison Hill in Wan Chai on Hong Kong Island in Hong Kong. It was opened in 1969 to replace the Eastern Public Dispensary and other clinics on Hong Kong Island.

The hospital merged administratively and operationally with Ruttonjee Hospital in 1998 to form one hospital and is a critical centre for emergency and vehicular accidents. Both names are kept.

It was named after its benefactor, the late Sir Tang Shiu-kin, Kt, C.B.E., LL.D. O.S.T. (Japan), J.P., KStJ, a famous Hong Kong philanthropist.

The Hong Kong Government and the Hospital Authority had approved a project to remodel the Tang Shiu Kin Hospital into a community ambulatory care centre. The remodelling project commenced in December 2002 and the new building was handed over to the hospital management on 1 April 2005. The centre houses a Traditional Chinese Medicine Clinic, A&E Training Centre, Family Medicine Training Centre, Integrated Clinic, Staff Clinic, Community Nursing Service, Pharmacy, Integrated Palliative Day Care Centre, Violet Peel General Outpatient Clinic, Wellness in Action and Allied Health Departments including Physiotherapy and Occupational Therapy. 

References

External links

Tang Shiu Kin Hospital web page at Hospital Authority website

Hospital buildings completed in 1969
Queen's Road East
Hospitals in Hong Kong
Morrison Hill
Hospitals established in 1969
1969 establishments in Hong Kong